Future US, Inc. (formerly known as Imagine Media and The Future Network USA) is an American media corporation specializing in targeted magazines and websites in the video games, music, and technology markets. Headquartered in New York City, the corporation has offices in: Alexandria, Virginia; Minneapolis, Minnesota; and Washington, D.C. Future US is owned by parent company, Future plc, a specialist media company based in Bath, Somerset, England.

History
The company was established when Future plc acquired struggling Greensboro (N.C.) video game magazine publisher GP Publications, publisher of Game Players magazine, in 1994.

The company launched a number of titles including PC Gamer, and relocated from North Carolina to the San Francisco Bay Area, occupying various properties in Burlingame and South San Francisco. When Chris Anderson, the founder of Future plc, sold Future to Pearson plc he retained GP, renamed Imagine Media, Inc. in June 1995, and operated it as his sole company for a few years.

Buoyed by the Internet economy and the success of Business 2.0 in the US (and subsequently in the UK, France, Italy and Germany), Future rode the boom of the late nineties. During this period the company won the exclusive worldwide rights to produce the official magazine for Microsoft's Xbox video game console and cemented its position as a leader in the games market. In the spring of 2001, buffeted by economic factors and the market downturn, Future Network USA went through a strategic reset of its business that included the closure of some titles and Internet operations and the sale of Business 2.0 to AOL/Time Warner.

On September 19, 2007, Nintendo and Future announced that Future US would obtain the publishing rights to Nintendo Power magazine. This came into effect with the creation of issue #222 (December 2007).

On October 1, 2007, it was announced that Future US would be making PlayStation: The Official Magazine, which ended up replacing PSM and first hit newsstands in November 2007. With this launch, Future US became the publisher of the official magazines of all three major console manufacturers in the US. PlayStation: The Official Magazine closed in 2012.

In 2012, NewBay Media bought the Music division of Future US.

Future used this acquisition to expand its US footprint, particularly in B2B segment.

Magazines and websites

Current titles
Its magazines and websites include:

AnandTech
Broadcasting & Cable
Electronic Musician
GamesRadar+
Guitar Player
Guitar World
MusicRadar
Laptop Mag
Live Science
MacLife
Marie Claire
Maximum PC
Multichannel News
Newsarama
PC Gamer
TechRadar
Tom's Hardware
TWICE
US Telecom Daily
5Gradar

Defunct titles

CD-ROM Today
Daily Radar
Decorating Spaces
Do!
Future Snowboarding Magazine
Game Players
Guitar One
Guitar World Acoustic
Guitar World Legends
Guitar World's Bass Guitar
Maximum Linux
Men's Edge
Mobile PC (magazine)
netPOWER
Next Generation Magazine
Nintendo Power
Official Dreamcast Magazine
Official Xbox Magazine
PC Accelerator
PlayStation: The Official Magazine
Pocket Gamer (not to be confused with Pocket Gamer by Steel Media)
Revolution
Scrapbook Answers
Skateboard Trade News
Snowboard Trade News
T3
The Net
Total Movie
Women's Health & Fitness

References

Magazine publishing companies of the United States
Computer magazine publishing companies
Publishing companies established in 1985
American subsidiaries of foreign companies
Publishing companies based in New York City
American companies established in 1985